Don't Dare to Dream, also known as Jealousy Incarnate, is a 2016 South Korean television series starring Gong Hyo-jin, Jo Jung-suk, Go Kyung-pyo, Lee Mi-sook, Park Ji-young, Lee Sung-jae, and Seo Ji-hye. It aired every Wednesday and Thursday at 22:00 (KST) on SBS from August 24 to November 10, 2016, for 24 episodes.

Synopsis 
Weather caster, Pyo Na-ri (Gong Hyo-jin), and news anchor, Lee Hwa-shin (Jo Jung-suk), are long-time colleagues at SBC broadcasting station. Na-ri has had a crush on Hwa-shin three years ago but things change when she meets the perfect man Go Jung-won (Go Kyung-pyo), a chaebol heir and close friend of Hwa-shin.

Meanwhile, Sung-sook (Lee Mi-sook) and Ja-young (Park Ji-young), who are rivals in both love and career, get entangled with Kim Rak (Lee Sung-jae), a restaurant owner and landlord of the building where Na-ri lives.

Cast

Main 
 Gong Hyo-jin as Pyo Na-ri
Na-ri is a weather broadcaster with an optimistic personality. Graduating from a third-rate college and having no money or connections, Na-ri is full of insecurities, but continues to persevere and work hard to keep her place at the station. She used to have a crush on Hwa-shin for 3 years.
 Jo Jung-suk as Lee Hwa-shin
Hwa-shin is a star reporter and news anchor with a great education and family background. He has a proud, competitive and macho personality; and gets jealous when Na-ri is with Jung-won as he starts developing feelings for her.
 Go Kyung-pyo as Go Jung-won
A polite, friendly man who is serious when it comes to love. Jung-won is the boss of a publishing company, and a chaebol heir of a large corporation that manages several luxury clothing brands. He falls for Na-ri at first sight.
 Lee Mi-sook as Kye Sung-sook
 A reporter-turned-anchorwoman. Jong-shin's first wife and Ppal-gang's mother.  
 Park Ji-young as Bang Ja-young
Department head of SBC station and announcer. Jong-shin's second wife. 
 Lee Sung-jae as Kim Rak
Chef and owner of a restaurant, and landlord to Nari and her family. A kind and caring man who cares for his tenants like family.  
 Seo Ji-hye as Hong Hye-won
The daughter of the Senior Secretary to the President for Public Affairs and a news anchor for the 7PM news. She's intelligent and capable in her career. However, in her 29 years of life, she hasn't had one ordeal to deal with and she doesn't believe people are equal, making her self-conceited and has a mingled reputation.

Supporting

Crazy 18 

 Moon Ga-young as  Lee Ppal-gang
 Kim Jung-hyun as Pyo Chi-yeol, Na-ri's brother 
 Ahn Woo-yeon as Oh Dae-goo

People around Hwa Shin 

 Park Jung-soo as Hwa-shin's mother
 Yoon Da-hoon as Lee Jong-shin, Hwa-shin's brother and Ppal-gang's father

People around Jung Won 

 Choi Hwa-jung as Kim Tae-ra, Jung-won's mother and Kim Rak's sister
 Park Sung-hoon as Secretary Cha

People at SBC broadcasting company 

 Kwon Hae-hyo as Oh Jong-hwan
 Jung Sang-hoon as Choi Dong-ki
 Yoo Jae-myung as Uhm Ki-dae
 Park Hwan-hee as Keum Soo-jung
 Park Eun-ji as Park Jin
 Seo Yu-ri as Hong Ji-min
 Kim Ye-won as Na Joo-hee
 Jun Ji-an as Im Soo-mi
 Yoo Jung-rae as Kan Mi-young
 Lee Chae-won as Yang Sung-sook
 Park Seo-young as Jang Hee-soo
 Sung Chang-hoon as New agency staff
 Lee Myung-haeng as 7 o'clock news anchor

People at Rak Villa 

 Seo Eun-soo as Ri Hong-dan, Na-ri and Chi-yeol's step mother
 Sul Woo-hyung as Pyo Bum, Na-ri's step brother
 Suh Hyun-suk as Lee Seung-han

People at Sun Hospital 

 Bae Hae-sun as Keum Suk-ho, Oncologist
 Park Jin-joo as Nurse Oh Jin-joo

Extended 

 Min Jung-sub
 Song Ha-rim as School office clerk who attended the festival
 Yeo Un-bok as surgeon
 Choi Kyu-sik as Taxi driver
 Lee Do-yeop
 Jang Hae-min
 Lee Yoon-sang as Executive Officer of Yonee Group's hotel
 Kwan Eun-soo

Special appearances 

 BamBam as Guy in Thailand nightclub (Ep. 1)
 Vivian Cha as Guy's girlfriend (Ep. 1)
 Yoo Jae-myung as news anchor 
 Lee Jung-eun as Orthopaedist 
 Oh Se-deuk as Chinese restaurant chef
 Jung Kyung-sun as Pyo Na-ri's mother
 Han Ji-min as Han Ji-min, Hwa-shin's blind date (Ep. 11)
 Kim Kyung-ran as announcer open recruitment judge (Ep. 14)
 Ahn Hye-kyung as announcer applicant (Ep. 14)
 Jun Hyun-moo as announcer applicant (SBS announcer) (Ep. 14)
 Oh Jung-yeon as announcer applicant (Ep. 14)
 Kim Yoon-sang as announcer applicant (SBS announcer) (Ep. 14)
 Lee Sun-kyun Na-ri's blind date (Voice) (Ep. 15) 
 Ko Sung-hee as Hong Soo-young, Hwa-shin and Jung-won's first love (Ep. 17)

Broadcast rights bidding
KBS 2TV and SBS both expressed interest in broadcast rights for Don't Dare to Dream. When the casting was first announced in February 2016, the drama was then in talks to air on KBS 2TV, but SBS decided to join the bidding war. In April 2016, it was announced that SBS won the drama's broadcast rights.

Original soundtrack

Charted songs

Ratings

Awards and nominations

Miscelleanous 
The show has been analyzed as "a case study of the application of the Tie-Up Theory to a romantic narrative as a form of simulation of human mating processes with social cognition valence".

References

External links 
 

Seoul Broadcasting System television dramas
2016 South Korean television series debuts
2016 South Korean television series endings
South Korean romantic comedy television series
Television series about television
Television series about journalism
Television series about cancer
Television series by SM C&C
Television shows written by Seo Sook-hyang